Monique Ganderton (born August 6, 1980) is a Canadian stunt performer and actress who works in television and film.

Ganderton was born in Edmonton, Alberta. She started out in modeling before moving to stunt work. Standing 5 ft 11 in (1.8 m) tall, she has doubled for tall actresses like Tricia Helfer, Rachel Nichols,  Leelee Sobieski, Bridget Moynahan, Daryl Hannah, Rebecca Romijn and Famke Janssen. In 2009, she was cast as Alia, a recurring role in Season 9 of Smallville. In the 2019 film Avengers: Endgame, Ganderton performed and coordinated stunts.

Filmography

Stunt work on TV
Masters of Horror (2002)
Battlestar Galactica (2003-2004)
Supernatural (2005)
The 4400 (2007)
Flash Gordon (2007–2008)
Blood Ties (2007)
Samurai Girl (2008)
Smallville (2008)
Stargate Universe (2009)
Human Target (2010)
Continuum (2013)

Stunt work on film
The Recruit (2003)
White Chicks (2004)
I, Robot (2004)
Resident Evil: Apocalypse (2004)
Fantastic Four (2005)
Underworld: Evolution (2006)
Final Days of Planet Earth (2006)
Engaged to Kill (2006)
X-Men: The Last Stand (2006)
A Girl Like Me: The Gwen Araujo Story (2006)
12 Hours to Live (2006)
The Wicker Man (2006)
Underfunded (2006)
In the Name of the King: A Dungeon Siege Tale (2007)
White Noise: The Light (2007)
Butterfly on a Wheel (2007)
When a Man Falls in the Forest (2007)
88 Minutes (2007)
Fantastic Four: Rise of the Silver Surfer (2007)
Alien Agent (2007)
Postal (2007)
Walk All Over Me (2007)
Devil's Diary (2007)
Battlestar Galactica: Razor (2007)
Another Cinderella Story (2008)
Joy Ride 2: Dead Ahead (2008)
Watchmen (2009)
The Imaginarium of Doctor Parnassus (2009)
2012 (2009)
Tron: Legacy (2010)
Dancing Ninja (2010)
The Cabin in the Woods (2011)
American Ultra (2015)
Suicide Squad (2016)
Atomic Blonde (2017)
Avengers: Infinity War (2018)
Avengers: Endgame (2019) - additionally the stunt coordinator

Actress on TV
Hendrix (2000)
Leap Years (2001)
Mutant X (2001)
1-800-Missing (2004)
The L Word (2005)
The 4400 (2006)
Blood Ties (2007)
Fallen (2007)
Supernatural (2007)
Smallville (2009–2010)
Continuum (TV series) (2012) as Yvonne Ducelle
Sleepy Hollow (2013) as Serilda
The Tomorrow People (2014) as Nelly
The 100 (2014, 2020) as Aurora Blake
Unreal (2016) as Brandi

Actress on Film
Chicago (2002)
The Wicker Man (2006)
The Secrets of Comfort House (2006)
A.M.P.E.D. (2007)
When a Man Falls in the Forest (2007)
Numb (2007)
Inseparable (2008)
Another Day in Hell (2009)
Merlin and the Book of Beasts (2009)
The King of Fighters (2010)
Icarus (2009)
Bad Meat (2009)
30 Days of Night: Dark Days (2010)
The Twilight Saga: Eclipse (2010)
Unrivaled (2010)
Hard Ride to Hell (2010)
The Cabin in the Woods (2011)
Hansel & Gretel: Witch Hunters (2013)
The Package (2013)
American Ultra (2015)
X-Men: Apocalypse (2016)
S.W.A.T.: Under Siege (2017)

References

External links 

1980 births
Actresses from Edmonton
Canadian film actresses
Canadian stunt performers
Canadian television actresses
Living people
21st-century Canadian actresses